The Czech Social Democratic Party (ČSSD) leadership election of 1999 was held on 11 April 1999. Zeman was re-elected for another term. Zeman was the only candidate. He also stated that he won't run for the position in 2001.

References

Czech Social Democratic Party leadership elections
Single-candidate elections
Social Democratic Party leadership election
Indirect elections
Czech Social Democratic Party leadership election
Czech Social Democratic Party leadership election